Kaija Silvennoinen (née Halonen; born May 5, 1954) is a Finnish ski orienteering competitor. At the World Ski Orienteering Championships in 1977 in Velingrad, Bulgaria, she won a gold medal in the relay, with Aila Flöjt and Sinikka Kukkonen, and placed fourth in the individual contest. At the World Ski Orienteering Championships in 1980 she won a gold medal with the Finnish relay team, together with Mirja Puhakka and Sinikka Kukkonen, and a silver medal in the individual contest.

See also
 Finnish orienteers
 List of orienteers
 List of orienteering events

References

Finnish orienteers
Female orienteers
Ski-orienteers
1954 births
Living people